Walewale is a town and the capital of Mamprusi West Municipal in the Northeast Region of Ghana. 
The West Mamprusi Municipal is one of the 261 Metropolitan, Municipal and District Assemblies (MMDAs) in Ghana, and forms part of the 6 MMDAs in the North East Region
The West Mamprusi Municipal is one of 45 new districts created in 1988 under the Government of Ghana’s decentralization and was later replaced with LI 2061 in 2012. With its administrative capital as Walewale,  
The Municipality is located within longitudes 0°35’W and 1°45’W and Latitude 9°55’N and 10°35’N. It has a total land size area of 2,596sq km.
It shares boundaries with East Mamprusi Municipal and Gushegu Municipal to the east; North Gonja District, Savelugu Municipal and Kumbungu District to the south; Builsa North District, Kassena-Nankana Municipal and Bolgatanga Municipal (Upper East Region) to the north and; to the west, Mamprusi Moagduri District.
The population of the Municipality according to 2021 population and housing census stands at 175,755 with 85,712 males and 90,043 females It lies on the main road from Bolgatanga to Tamale, at the junction of the road west to Nalerigu, the capital of the newly created Northeast Region. It was founded by the Mamprusis. The language spoken by the people of Walewale is largely Mampruli, which is followed by kassim, guruni, moshie. The dominant religion is Islam but a lot of churches are emerged in recent times. Walewale prides itself of four standard banks which are; Ghana Commercial Bank, Agricultural Development Bank, Bangmarigu Community Bank and GN Bank which is currently defunct. The town has about ten standard guest houses with two five star hotels located along the main road leading to Bolgatanga, the Upper East Regional capital. There are seven  fuel filling stations in the community, namely; Total Filling Station, Nasona Fuel Station, Zen Fuel Station, Goil Fuel Station, Gabs Filling Station  and Petrosol, It also has a gas station located along the Nalerigu road.

Walewale has two   radio stations, Eagle FM and Wale FM  running on the frequencies 94.1(MHz), 106.9 (MHz) respectively  which broadcasts in English and the local language; Mampruli. They also have radio sessions broadcast in Frafra and other local languages. The town is also one of the municipalities to have benefited from the Zongo Ministry's artificial pitches. This makes the community suitable in hosting any tournament in the newly created Northeast region.

Walewale can boast of its over 100-bed health facility that is enhanced with three ambulances. The town is also the central point of the Zipline drones used for medical purposes. The Zipline Medical drone Center is currently an operational drone center in Ghana and it is meant to serve all five northern Regions.

Walewale's mosque, built in 1961 on the site of an earlier mud-and-stick mosque, is notable for its Moorish tower.

References

Populated places in the North East Region (Ghana)